Lotz Károly Antal Pál, or Karl Anton Paul Lotz (16 December 1833 – 13 October 1904) was a German-Hungarian painter.

Career 

Karl Lotz was born in Bad Homburg vor der Höhe, Germany, the 7th and youngest surviving child of Wilhelm Christian Lotz and Antonia Höfflick (Höfflich). His father was a valet of Prince Gustav zu Hessen-Homburg at the time when the prince was representing Austria at the Congress of Vienna, which among other matters dealt with the House of Hessen-Homburg's rights of sovereignty over Hessen-Darmstadt. The sudden death of the young Baron von Sinclair, chargé d'affaires, forced W. C. Lotz temporarily into the rôle. While in Hungary in 1815 he made the acquaintance of the 13-year-old Antonie Hoefflich, whom he married three years later. She gave birth to 8 children, of whom Karl was the youngest.

W. C. Lotz died in 1837 and Antonie moved the family to Pest (now one of the three constituent parts of Budapest; the one on the east bank of the River Danube). Karl attended the Piaristengymnasium, where, although Calvinist, he was awarded a scholarship for his exceptional academic performance. He began his artistic career as a pupil of the Hofkapellmeister Destouches, then in the academy of the Venetian master Jakab Marastoni (1804–1860). Later he was a pupil of the historical painters Henrik Weber (1818–1866) in Budapest and Carl Rahl (1812–1865) in Vienna.

Together with Rahl he worked on numerous commissions. Later he started on his own original works, first as a romantic landscape artist in scenes of the Alföld (the Hungarian lowland plain), and then as a creator of monumental murals and frescos in the style of the Venetian master Tiepolo.

After various works in Budapest he became active in Vienna. He laid out plans for a grandiose palace, and completed murals commissioned by the Abbot of Tihany Abbey for his abbey church on the shore of Lake Balaton. He became known for his portraits and nudes, for which both his wife and his daughters (Katarina in particular) posed. Lotz found married bliss only at the age of 58, when he married the widow Jacoboy, the former wife of his brother Paul Johann Heinrich, who had died in 1828. From then on he signed his works Károly Jacoboy-Lotz.

In 1882 Lotz was appointed Professor at various art academies in Budapest, and in 1885 he became dean of a newly established department for women painters. He was an honorary member of the Academy of Pictorial Arts in Vienna.

His last important public commission was the "Apotheosis of the Habsburg Dynasty", a huge ceiling fresco in the Habsburg Room of the newly rebuilt Royal Palace, that he painted in 1903, one year before his death. Lotz was already seriously ill when he worked on the fresco. The "Apotheosis" followed the traditions of Baroque court painting and the work was praised by contemporary critics. The fresco survived the war unscathed, but it was destroyed in the 1950s.

He died in 1904 in Budapest. As a "Prince of Hungarian Artists" he was given a state funeral and interred inside a memorial. His pictures, drawings and sketches were donated to the State of Hungary and are now in the Szépművészeti Múzeum. Several Hungarian cities have streets named after him, there are Hungarian stamps bearing his likeness, and there is a bust in the National Museum in Budapest.

Painting works 

 Ceiling of the Budapest Opera (1884)
 Mural in the large ceremonial room of the Hungarian Academy of Sciences in Budapest
 Mural in the stairways of the Hungarian Parliament Building in Budapest (1897)
 Mural in Hungarian National Museum in Budapest (1874)
 Mural in the Redoutensaal (Pesti Vigadó) of Budapest's main concert hall
 Mural in the casino of Theresienstadt (Terezín), the Czech Republic
 Ceiling and mural in the Stephansbasilika of Budapest as well as the seminary
 "Apotheosis of the Habsburg Dynasty", ceiling fresco in Buda Castle (1903, lost)
 Mural in the main market hall of Budapest
 Mural in the east railway station of Budapest
 Mural in the reading room of the library of Budapest University
 Ceiling and mural in the Matthiaskirche (Church of St. Matthew) in Budapest
 Ceiling and mural in the Justice Palace of Budapest (1894)
 Mural in the Weapons Museum of the Arsenal in Budapest
 Frescos of the Heinrichshof in Vienna (destroyed in WWII)
 Various works at the palace of Earl Károlyi
 Various works at the palace of Baron Weckheim
 Various works at the palace of Baron Lipthay
 Mural for the Tihany at Lake Balaton

Gallery

Quotes

References 
 Austrian Biographical Lexicon: Österreichisches Biographisches Lexikon (ÖBL) 1815-1950, Bd. 5 (Lfg. 24), p. 332 (de)

External links 

 
  Detailed Biography of Károly Lotz
 Biography and Pictures of Károly Lotz

Hungarian painters
19th-century German painters
19th-century male artists
German male painters
20th-century German painters
20th-century German male artists
Hungarian people of German descent
Academic art
People from Bad Homburg vor der Höhe
1833 births
1904 deaths
Burials at Kerepesi Cemetery